The 1992–93 A Group was the 45th season of the A Football Group, the top Bulgarian professional league for association football clubs, since its establishment in 1948.

Overview
It was contested by 16 teams, and Levski Sofia won the championship.

League standings

Results

Champions
Levski Sofia

Top scorers

Source:1992–93 Top Goalscorers

References
Bulgaria - List of final tables (RSSSF)

First Professional Football League (Bulgaria) seasons
Bulgaria
1